Omega Phi Gamma (also known as Omegas or OPhiG) is an Asian-Interest fraternity. They strive to promote brotherhood, leadership, and service within the Asian-American community, and continue to maintain the highest levels of excellence while encouraging the growth of strong and successful men.

History

Omega Phi Gamma was founded at the University of Texas at Austin in the fall of 1995. The founding fathers were originally brought together by their sister sorority, Sigma Phi Omega. The founders took the Sigma Phi Omega big brother program and merged it with close friends to form the original group of brothers. What they envisioned was an Asian American organization that truly promoted the principles of brotherhood and provided a balance between community service and social activity

The founding fathers came together for the first time on November 18, 1994. On December 2, 1994, the founders officially introduced themselves with a new fraternity tradition, the step show. During the spring of 1995, they began working on a charter from other already established Asian fraternities. However, they were unimpressed with the quality of the fraternities they visited, and so the founders voted unanimously to start a fraternity from scratch, Omega Phi Gamma.

After the founders created Omega Phi Gamma, one of its early members propose to create a brother fraternity and asked for support in building another fraternity from scratch which is now Delta Epsilon Psi, a South Asian interest fraternity. Alongside with Sigma Phi Omega and Delta Epsilon Psi they created the original Tri-fam and has one of the strongest bonds between organizations.

Founding Fathers

Alex Chang
Ting Chang
Tom Chang
Charlie Chang
Christian Fernandez 
Michael Gong
Minh Ha
Jeff Ho
Nguyen Ho
Dave Lee

Matthew Lee
Michael Lee
Sung Lim
Hsin-Lei Liu
Thomas Nguyen
Andy Pan
William Reeves
Andrew To
Joseph Yu
Stephen Yuen

Unity Talent Show
One of the annual events that Omegas are best known for is their UNITY talent show, where the brothers perform their traditional step routine and new step show. UNITY is hosted in the first few weeks of the fall semester and has been a popular annual fraternity tradition since 1995—the event often filling up to capacity. UNITY is a showcase of Asian American talent, where a majority of Asian organizations on campus perform with the message of celebrating their heritage, promoting cultural diversity, and recognizing the similarities and differences of all Asian-American cultures in hopes of bringing people closer together.

Philanthropy/Scholarships
Omega Phi Gamma Endowment Scholarship  
Omega Phi Gamma is the only fraternity at the University of Texas at Austin with an endowment scholarship program to help incoming students financially with their education. The Omega Phi Gamma Endowment Scholarship program is funded by the alumni of the fraternity to benefit incoming freshmen who are pursuing degrees in natural sciences, engineering, business, geology, and other academic areas.

Philanthropy
As a service/social fraternity, Omega Phi Gamma partake in numerous community service events every year. As part of their annual philanthropic project, they raise funds for the Lance Armstrong Foundation as part of their Riding to Fight Cancer Week. Within this project, they participate in the Austin LIVESTRONG Challenge to raise awareness for the fight against cancer. The fraternity has raised over 10,000 dollars for the Lance Armstrong Foundation and the fight against cancer.
 

In addition to this, Omega Phi Gamma is prominently involved on campus and in the local community. The fraternity has been volunteering at local schools tutoring children, at the University United Methodist Church feeding the homeless, and most recently at Project 2016, a community service project sponsored by the University of Texas at Austin, fixing houses to be given to those less fortunate. They have also adopted a street as part of the Keep Austin Beautiful project.

Chapters
Founding Chapter – University of Texas at Austin 
Alpha Chapter – Baylor University (Reserved) 
Beta Chapter – University of Houston
Gamma Chapter – University of Texas at San Antonio
Delta Chapter – Texas A&M University
Epsilon Chapter – Dallas, Texas
Zeta Chapter – University of California at Irvine
Eta Chapter – Texas State University

Affiliations
Sister Sorority – Sigma Phi Omega
Brother Fraternity – Delta Epsilon Psi

See also

Cultural interest fraternities and sororities
List of social fraternities and sororities

External links
 http://www.omegaphigamma.com/
 http://www.utomegaphigamma.com/
 https://uh.collegiatelink.net/organization/omegaphigamma

Fraternities and sororities in the United States
Asian-American fraternities and sororities
Student organizations established in 1995
1995 establishments in Texas